Madison County Public Schools is a public school district serving Madison County, North Carolina.

History
In 2022 the sheriff announced that each school would have an AR-15 gun for protection against instances of school shootings. This is a joint project of the school district and the Madison County Sheriff's Office, and it was done in response to the Robb Elementary School shooting in Uvalde, Texas.

Administration

Superintendent
Madison County Schools is led by Dr. Will Hoffman as superintendent.

Board of Education
As of January 2019 the Board of Education consists of:

Karen Blevins, Chairperson 
Kelby Cody, Vice Chairperson 
Kevin Barnette, Member
Barbara Wyatt, Member
Keith Ray, Member

Facilities

Early Childhood
Marshall Center
Mars Hill Center
Madison High School Center

Primary education
Brush Creek Elementary School
Hot Springs Elementary School
(Laurel Elementary School was closed/merged into Hot Springs Elem.)
Mars Hill Elementary School

Secondary education
Madison Middle School
Madison High School
Madison Early College High School

References

Education in Madison County, North Carolina
School districts in North Carolina